Dahaneh-ye Shirin (also Romanized as Dahneh-ye Shīrīn) is a village in Safiabad Rural District, Bam and Safiabad District, Esfarayen County, North Khorasan Province, Iran. At the 2006 census, its population was 559, in 151 families.

References 

Populated places in Esfarayen County